Krishnagiri is a village in Krishnagiri mandal, located in Kurnool district of the Indian state of Andhra Pradesh.

References

Villages in Kurnool district